Events in the year 2015 in Eritrea.

Incumbents 

 President: Isaias Afewerki

Events 

 22 – 30 August – The country competed at the 2015 World Championships in Athletics in Beijing, China.

Deaths

References 

 
2010s in Eritrea
Years of the 21st century in Eritrea
Eritrea
Eritrea